Pomme or pommes may refer to:

 Pomme (singer), a French singer
 Pomme, a green (vert) roundel in heraldry

Other languages

French 
 Apple
 Pomme de terre, Potato
 Pomme frites, French fries
 Pommes fondant, Fondant potatoes

See also
 "Pomme, pomme, pomme", the Luxembourgish entry in the 1971 Eurovision Song Contest
 La Pomme Marseille, a former name for cycling team Marseille 13-KTM
 Pommie, Australian slang word for British
 Pom (disambiguation)
 Pomme de Terre (disambiguation)